Mikel Arruabarrena Aranbide (born 9 February 1983) is a Spanish former professional footballer who played as a centre-forward, currently manager of Tolosa CF.

Club career
Born in Tolosa, Basque Country, Arruabarrena had stints with local giants Athletic Bilbao and Navarrese neighbours CA Osasuna, but did not made it past the reserves on either occasion. From 2006 to 2008, he played in the Segunda División with Xerez CD and CD Tenerife.

Arruabarrena was bought by Poland's Legia Warsaw alongside compatriots Iñaki Descarga and Iñaki Astiz in June 2008. However, in January of the following year, he was loaned to SD Eibar also in his native region and the second division, not being able to prevent the team from eventually dropping down a tier.

In that summer, Arruabarrena arranged for a buyout of his Legia contract to remain at Eibar permanently, completing several seasons with the side in Segunda División B. On 12 December 2012, he was decisive in eliminating former club Athletic from the Copa del Rey, after scoring in a 1–1 draw at the San Mamés Stadium (his team progressed on the away goals rule).

Arruabarrena contributed 36 games and seven goals in the 2013–14 season, as the Armeros promoted to La Liga for the first time ever. He renewed his link with the club on 27 June 2014, and made his debut in the competition on 24 August at the age of 31, playing the full 90 minutes in a 1–0 home win against Real Sociedad.

Arruabarrena scored his first goal in the Spanish top flight on 24 September 2014, in a 1–1 home draw against Villarreal CF. On 24 January 2016, he was loaned to SD Huesca from the second division until the end of the season.

In 2016, Arruabarrena left Spain again, to join AEL Limassol of the Cypriot First Division. He returned to his country in January 2018, signing a two-year deal with third-tier CF Fuenlabrada.

Honours
Eibar
Segunda División: 2013–14

References

External links

1983 births
Living people
People from Tolosa, Spain
Sportspeople from Gipuzkoa
Spanish footballers
Footballers from the Basque Country (autonomous community)
Association football forwards
La Liga players
Segunda División players
Segunda División B players
Tercera División players
CD Basconia footballers
Bilbao Athletic footballers
Athletic Bilbao footballers
CA Osasuna B players
Xerez CD footballers
CD Tenerife players
SD Eibar footballers
CD Leganés players
SD Huesca footballers
CF Fuenlabrada footballers
Pontevedra CF footballers
Ekstraklasa players
Legia Warsaw players
Cypriot First Division players
AEL Limassol players
Spain youth international footballers
Basque Country international footballers
Spanish expatriate footballers
Expatriate footballers in Poland
Expatriate footballers in Cyprus
Spanish expatriate sportspeople in Poland
Spanish expatriate sportspeople in Cyprus
Spanish football managers
Tercera División managers
Tercera Federación managers